The Yugoslav Partisans formed operational detachments in Bosnia and Herzegovina after the German-led Axis invasion of Yugoslavia during World War II. These detachments were formed to conduct local operations against the occupying powers and those collaborating with them, and a total of 108 detachments were created in Bosnia and Herzegovina during the war. The detachments were named after a district, town, region or geographic feature, and ranged in size from 16 to 3,000 fighters. Larger detachments were usually divided into several companies or battalions. Some detachments had a very brief existence, whereas others existed for most of the war and a few were disestablished and re-established several times. Information on some small or short-lived detachments is very limited. There were also a significant number of independent battalions outside the detachment framework, but these are not included in the scope of this article.

Background
After the German-led Axis invasion of Yugoslavia in April 1941, the Communist Party of Yugoslavia (KPJ) began to organise for military resistance if Germany attacked the Soviet Union. This involved the establishment of a central military committee on 10 April while the invasion was still underway, and the creation of a military committee for each of the "provinces" of Yugoslavia in late April after the surrender. These provinces were based on the historical "national" entities of the country, rather than the pre-war political divisions, or banovina which had artificially divided the "national" entities to reduce the threat of nationalism. Each province already had a Provincial Committee of the KPJ reporting to the Central Committee, so these provincial military committees were created in parallel with the party organisation. One of the "national" entities consisted of the regions of Bosnia and Herzegovina, which were now encompassed by the Axis puppet state known as the Independent State of Croatia (NDH). The NDH also included much of present-day Croatia. The Provincial Committee for Bosnia-Herzegovina was based in Sarajevo.

In late May and June 1941, members of the Provincial Committee for Bosnia-Herzegovina travelled to the oblast (regional) centres of Banja Luka in the Bosanska Krajina region, Mostar in Herzegovina, and Tuzla in the Birač region of eastern Bosnia to advise the oblast KPJ committees of the decisions of the Central Committee, and to form oblast military committees. This also occurred in Sarajevo, for an oblast military committee responsible for the Romanija region of eastern Bosnia located north of that city. Each oblast military committee formed district military committees, who in turn contacted KPJ members in towns and villages of their district to organise resistance. This pyramid-like structure mirrored the KPJ structure, and following the German invasion of the Soviet Union on 22 June, the Central Committee met on 4 July and decided to initiate an armed uprising against the occupiers. This included the creation of a formal military structure, headed by the Chief Headquarters for the People's Liberation Partisan Detachments of Yugoslavia under the leadership of Josip Broz Tito, who was also the General Secretary of the Central Committee of the KPJ.

Svetozar Vukmanović, a Montenegrin member of the Central Committee was appointed to command the Provincial Military Staff for Bosnia-Herzegovina. Vukmanović was widely known by the nickname "Tempo" owing to his constant urging of his subordinates to hurry. Vukmanović-Tempo called a meeting of the Provincial KPJ Committee in Sarajevo on 13 July. This meeting appointed Iso Jovanović, the secretary of the Provincial KPJ Committee, and Boriša Kovačević as the other two members of the Provincial Military Staff for Bosnia-Herzegovina, and redesignated the four oblast military committees as "military staffs". One member of the Provincial KPJ Committee was sent to each of the three military staffs outside Sarajevo to assist them. Đuro Pucar-Stari, a native of Bosansko Grahovo in the Krajina was sent to Banja Luka, Uglješa Danilović, a native of Odžak in northeastern Bosnia was sent to Tuzla, and Avdo Humo was sent to his home town of Mostar. The leaders at the district level in each region were appointed as military commissioners, and this was repeated at the village level if KPJ members or sympathisers existed.

Major developments

July uprising

On 27 July, an uprising broke out in the Krajina, triggered by the ambush and killing of a Croatian Home Guard officer. This had resulted in the rounding up and maltreatment of ethnic Serb villagers in the Bosansko Grahovo district. The local KPJ structures were not ready to launch an uprising, and had no instructions to do so. They were drawn into a mass Serb uprising not of their creation, and quickly had to adapt to their circumstances. The following day, an uprising broke out in the Romanija region, and this was followed by an outbreak of resistance in the Birač region on 5 August. The forces involved in this fighting were spontaneously formed companies based on the traditional social structure of villages, which were grouped into battalions when numbers dictated. Where the opportunity arose, KPJ members and military staff at the district and village level would attempt to gain some control over these units, but they were far from communist-led as a whole, at least initially. KPJ-led rebels across Bosnia-Herzegovina formed military structures as needed, without any central direction, and brigades and even a division were formed. In the Drvar district for example, units were known as "Guerilla" rather than "Partisan" detachments, and in some cases several companies formed a detachment, where in others, several detachments formed a company.

Establishment of a uniform system of organisation

On 26 September 1941, the Chief Headquarters for the People's Liberation Partisan Detachments of Yugoslavia held a conference at Stolice in the German-occupied territory of Serbia, at which it adopted a standard structure for the military organisation of the resistance. The Chief Headquarters was renamed the Supreme Headquarters, and the Military Staff of each province became the General Staff. The basic Partisan unit was to be a company of 80–100 soldiers, composed of platoons and sections. Two to four companies were to make up a battalion, and three to four battalions formed a detachment, the largest unit of the Partisan forces. Each detachment would have a staff consisting of a commander and deputy, with a political commissar and deputy, and the detachment staff would be directly responsible to the General Staff. On that basis, the existing Partisan units operating in Bosnia-Herzegovina were re-organised in October and November 1941 into ten detachments, six in east Bosnia, three in Bosanska Krajina, and one in Herzegovina. The Sarajevo and Tuzla Military Staffs were dissolved and detachments in those regions were placed under the direct control of the General Staff for the People's Liberation Partisan Detachments of Bosnia-Herzegovina.

The "Volunteer Army"
As a result of simmering tension between Serb-chauvinists and the communists, the Provincial Committee of the KPJ for Bosnia-Herzegovina held a conference at Ivančići in the Romanija region on 7–8 January 1942. This conference was chaired by Tito, and one of the outcomes was the creation of a "Volunteer Army" of soldiers that would fight alongside the Partisans under shared command, but were not willing to become Partisans themselves. The Supreme Headquarters was renamed the Supreme Headquarters for the People's Liberation Partisan and Volunteer Army of Yugoslavia. This was intended to drive a wedge between Bosnian Chetniks and the Serbian-based Yugoslav Chetnik movement of Draža Mihailović. Seven "volunteer" detachments were raised, all in eastern Bosnia, and some battalions and companies of former Chetniks were placed under the command of existing detachments. In all, the "Volunteer Army" numbered a maximum of 7,000–8,000 fighters who were, according to the historian Marko Attila Hoare, of "dubious political loyalty and military value". The short-lived "Volunteer Army" concept was dispensed with following pro-Chetnik coups in both "volunteer" and Partisan detachments in eastern Bosnia in April and May 1942, and was quietly abolished by Tito in November 1942. After this, until the formation of the Yugoslav Army in the last six months of the war, the title of the Partisan army was the People's Liberation Army and Partisan Detachments of Yugoslavia.

Detachments
A total of 108 detachments were created in Bosnia and Herzegovina during the war. The detachments were named after a district, town, region or geographic feature, and ranged in size from 16 to 3,000 fighters. Larger detachments were usually divided into several companies or battalions. Some detachments had a very brief existence, whereas others existed for most of the war and a few were disestablished and re-established several times. Information on some small or short-lived detachments is very limited.

Notes

Footnotes

References

 
 

Military units and formations of the Yugoslav Partisans
Yugoslavia in World War II